Christian Ignacio Ramírez Sánchez (born 14 May 1993 in Guanajuato, Mexico) is a Mexican professional footballer who currently plays for Inter Playa del Carmen. He made his professional debut with Santos Laguna during a Copa MX victory over Correcaminos UAT on 19 August 2014.

References

1993 births
Living people
Mexican footballers
Association football defenders
Santos Laguna footballers
Tampico Madero F.C. footballers
Inter Playa del Carmen players
Ascenso MX players
Liga Premier de México players
Tercera División de México players
Footballers from Guanajuato
People from Irapuato